Lloyd Rose is an American writer most associated with her work on various Doctor Who spin-offs. She has also written for the American television series Homicide: Life on the Street and Kingpin. She often jokes in her biographies that her name is the pen name of a writer called Sarah Tonyn (a pun on serotonin), although (despite the information on her IMDb entry) she has not had any professional writing published under this name.

Work
Rose was the theatre critic for the Washington Post.

She adapted the autobiographical comics stories of Harvey Pekar into a stage version of American Splendor, which was produced in 1987 at Washington, DC's Arena Stage, directed by James C. Nicola.

Rose wrote the season seven story Zen and the Art of Murder for the series Homicide: Life on the Street in 1993 and was one of the writers for the 2003 mini-series Kingpin. After becoming a fan of the Virgin New Adventures, Lloyd sent a proposal for an Eighth Doctor Adventure to BBC Books which eventually became the story The City of the Dead (BBC Books, 2001). This novel was highly regarded by both the readership and her contemporaries, and led to two further novels — Camera Obscura (BBC Books, 2002; winner of the 2002 Doctor Who Magazine Award) and The Algebra of Ice (BBC Books, 2004) — being published, the latter as part of the BBC's Past Doctor Adventures range.

Following the popular reception for her novels, Rose also wrote an audio adventure for Big Finish Productions, Caerdroia (Big Finish, November 2004).

References

External links

Outpost Gallifrey's Lloyd Rose page
Big Finish's "Caerdroia" page
Interview

21st-century American novelists
American women novelists
American television writers
American science fiction writers
Living people
Women science fiction and fantasy writers
American women dramatists and playwrights
21st-century American women writers
Writers of Doctor Who novels
American women television writers
Year of birth missing (living people)